The 1990 Maryland Terrapins football team represented University of Maryland, College Park in the 1990 NCAA Division I-A football season. The Terrapins offense scored 237 points while the defense allowed 284 points. Led by head coach Joe Krivak, the Terrapins appeared in the Independence Bowl against Louisiana Tech and tied the Bulldogs, 34–34.

Schedule

1991 NFL Draft
The following players were selected in the 1991 NFL Draft.

References

Maryland
Maryland Terrapins football seasons
Maryland Terrapins football